Tschima da Flix is a mountain of the Albula Alps, located between Piz Calderas and Piz d'Agnel, in the canton of Graubünden. On the northern side of the mountain lies a glacier named Vadret da Calderas.

References

External links
 Tschima da Flix

Mountains of the Alps
Alpine three-thousanders
Mountains of Graubünden
Mountains of Switzerland
Bever, Switzerland
Surses